Macrohyliota is a genus of beetles in the family Silvanidae. There are six known members of the genus, all occurring in the Asian and Australian regions.

Macrohyliota can be distinguished from other genera in the subfamily Brontinae, tribe Brontini, by their relatively large, loosely jointed bodies, with a brown, granular incrustation that obscures the surface sculpture to a greater or lesser extent (individuals
of two included species lack the incrustation). Individuals of most of the species have a tooth or carina on the mesotibia, and in most of the species there are small mandibular horns in the males. Described species and their distributions are:

 Macrohyliota bicolor Arrow, Australia
 Macrohyliota gracilicornis (Arrow), SE Asia, New Guinea
 Macrohyliota lucius (Pascoe), Australia
 Macrohyliota militaris (Erichson), Australia
 Macrohyliota spinicollis (Gory), SE Asia
 Macrohyliota truncatipennis (Heller), SE Asia

References

Silvanidae

Háva J. 2016. Macrohyliota philippinensis sp. nov. (Coleoptera: Silvanidae: Brontinae), a new species from the Philippines. ARQUIVOS ENTOMOLÓXICOS, 16: 431-434.